The 1985 Swedish motorcycle Grand Prix was the eleventh round of the 1985 Grand Prix motorcycle racing season. It took place on the weekend of 9–11 August at the Scandinavian Raceway.

This was the last victory for the American Freddie Spencer.

Classification

500 cc

References

Swedish motorcycle Grand Prix
Swedish
Motorcycle